Die Watching is a 1993 American direct-to-video erotic thriller film starring former teen idol Christopher Atkins as a psychotic pornographic film director named Michael Terrence, who moonlights as a voyeuristic murderer. The story borrows heavily from Michael Powell's 1960 British film Peeping Tom. It was originally released on VHS in the United States on August 25, 1993 and on DVD by Image Entertainment in 1999.

Plot
Scarred by repressed memories of his late mother, Michael overcomes his inner pain through the merciless slaughter of various women. His killing spree is characterized by a very peculiar modus operandi: he films each murder with his video camera and forces each victim to watch the film as they die. However, his dark side is penetrated via the romantic attentions of pretty neighbor Nola Carlisle (Vali Ashton), who seems intent on learning all she can about her handsome new friend.

Cast
Christopher Atkins - Michael Terrence
Vali Ashton - Nola Carlisle
Mike Jacobs Jr. - Adam Parker
Tim Thomerson - Detective Lewis
Carlos Palomino - Detective Barry
Erika Nann - Gabrielle
Sally Champlin - Julienne
Michael E. Bauer - Jake
Ewing Miles Brown - Lucky, studio director
Melanie Good - Sheila Walsh
Avalon Anders - Marie
Allen Fawcett - Michael's father
Ashley F. Brooks - Michael's mother
Matthew J. Boyle - young Michael
Tammy Elaine - girl #1

References

External links

 

1993 films
1993 direct-to-video films
1990s erotic thriller films
American direct-to-video films
American erotic thriller films
American serial killer films
American independent films
Erotic romance films
Films about sexuality
Direct-to-video erotic thriller films
New World Pictures films
American thriller television films
1990s English-language films
1990s American films